S. Thenmozhi is an Indian politician and is Member of the Legislative Assembly of Tamil Nadu. Thenmozhi was elected to the Tamil Nadu legislative assembly as an All India Anna Dravida Munnetra Kazhagam candidate from Nilakottai constituency in the by-election in 2019.

References 

Living people
All India Anna Dravida Munnetra Kazhagam politicians
People from Dindigul district
Year of birth missing (living people)
Tamil Nadu MLAs 2021–2026